Miamira miamirana is a species of colorful dorid nudibranch, a sea slug, a shell-less marine gastropod mollusk in the family Chromodorididae.

References

 Debelius, H. & Kuiter, R.H. (2007) Nudibranchs of the world. ConchBooks, Frankfurt, 360 pp.  page(s): 103 
 Gosliner, T.M., Behrens, D.W. & Valdés, Á. (2008) Indo-Pacific Nudibranchs and seaslugs. A field guide to the world's most diverse fauna. Sea Challengers Natural History Books, Washington, 426 pp. page(s): 273
 Johnson R.F. (2011) Breaking family ties: taxon sampling and molecular phylogeny of chromodorid nudibranchs (Mollusca, Gastropoda). Zoologica Scripta 40(2): 137-157. page(s): 139
 Yonow N. (2012) Opisthobranchs from the western Indian Ocean, with descriptions of two new species and ten new records (Mollusca, Gastropoda). ZooKeys 197: 1–129.
  Johnson R.F. & Gosliner T.M. (2012) Traditional taxonomic groupings mask evolutionary history: A molecular phylogeny and new classification of the chromodorid nudibranchs. PLoS ONE 7(4): e33479

External links

 SeaSlug Forum factsheet

Chromodorididae
Gastropods described in 1875